Eikelandsosen is a village in the municipality of Bjørnafjorden in Vestland county, Norway.  It is located at the end of the Eikelandsfjorden, a small arm off the main Fusafjorden.  The village sits to the southeast of the village of Holmefjord, west of the village of Holdhus, and northeast of the village of Fusa.

The village was the administrative center of the old Fusa Municipality prior to its dissolution in 2020.

References

Bjørnafjorden
Villages in Vestland